Jonathan Aberdein (born 14 February 1998) is a South African racing driver. He currently competes for Jota Sport in the 2022 FIA World Endurance Championship.

He previously competed in the FIA Formula 3 European Championship with Motopark. He has also raced in the ADAC Formula 4 in both 2016 and 2017 and won the 2016–17 Formula 4 UAE Championship in dominant fashion.

He is the son of Chris Aberdein, who was an Audi and Porsche works driver in South Africa in the 1990s.

Racing record

Career summary

* Season still in progress.

Complete ADAC Formula 4 Championship results 
(key) (Races in bold indicate pole position) (Races in italics indicate fastest lap)

Complete Formula 4 UAE Championship results 
(key) (Races in bold indicate pole position; races in italics indicate fastest lap)

Complete FIA Formula 3 European Championship results
(key) (Races in bold indicate pole position) (Races in italics indicate fastest lap)

‡ Half points awarded as less than 75% of race distance was completed.

Complete Deutsche Tourenwagen Masters results

Complete European Le Mans Series results
(key) (Races in bold indicate pole position; results in italics indicate fastest lap)

Complete 24 Hours of Le Mans results

Complete FIA World Endurance Championship results
(key) (Races in bold indicate pole position; races in italics indicate fastest lap)

* Season still in progress.

Complete ADAC GT Masters results
(key) (Races in bold indicate pole position) (Races in italics indicate fastest lap)

References

South African racing drivers
1998 births
Living people
ADAC Formula 4 drivers
FIA Formula 3 European Championship drivers
Deutsche Tourenwagen Masters drivers
FIA World Endurance Championship drivers
24 Hours of Le Mans drivers
European Le Mans Series drivers
ADAC GT Masters drivers
Motopark Academy drivers
W Racing Team drivers
Racing Bart Mampaey drivers
United Autosports drivers
Jota Sport drivers
Audi Sport drivers
BMW M drivers
UAE F4 Championship drivers